Xeneboda kumasiana is a species of moth of the family Tortricidae. It is found in Ghana.

References

Endemic fauna of Ghana
Moths described in 2000
Polyorthini
Insects of West Africa
Moths of Africa
Taxa named by Józef Razowski